Preston 28 February 1980 is a live album by English post-punk band Joy Division featuring a performance on 28 February 1980 at The Warehouse, Preston. The album was released on 24 May 1999 in the UK by record label NMC Music and in the US on 13 July 1999.

Content 

The image on the cover is a scrambled photo of the venue.

Release 

Preston 28 February 1980 was released on 24 May 1999 in the UK by record label NMC Music and 13 July 1999 in the US.
It was also released in a "boxed set", packaged with the Les Bains Douches album.

Reception 

CMJ Music Monthly called it "an exceptionally intense gig that goes much further toward demonstrating the importance of the short-lived band". Pitchfork described the recording as "bafflingly low-quality", and the gig has supposedly been described by members of the band as "the worst fucking show we ever did".

Track listing

References

External links 

 

Joy Division live albums
1999 live albums